The prime minister of Rhodesia (Southern Rhodesia before 1964) was the head of government of Rhodesia. Rhodesia, which had become a self-governing colony of the United Kingdom in 1923, unilaterally declared independence on 11 November 1965, and was thereafter an unrecognized state until 1979. In December 1979, the country came under temporary British control, and in April 1980 the country gained recognized independence as Zimbabwe.

Rhodesia's political system was modelled on the Westminster system, and the role of the prime minister was similar to that of countries with similar constitutional histories – for example, Australia and Canada.

History

The British self-governing colony of Southern Rhodesia—simply Rhodesia from October 1964—was created on 1 October 1923, from land previously governed by the British South Africa Company. The British government annexed the land, then immediately sold it to the newly formed responsible government of Southern Rhodesia for £2 million.

From 1953 to 1963, Northern Rhodesia, Southern Rhodesia and Nyasaland—equivalent to today's Zambia, Zimbabwe and Malawi, respectively—were joined in the Federation of Rhodesia and Nyasaland, also known as the Central African Federation.  Godfrey Huggins served as Federal Prime Minister from 1953 to 1956, then Roy Welensky held the post until the end of Federation on 31 December 1963. When Northern Rhodesia gained independence as Zambia on 24 October 1964, Southern Rhodesia began to refer to itself simply as "Rhodesia".

Prime Minister Ian Smith's government issued a Unilateral Declaration of Independence from Britain in 1965, and he remained prime minister when the country was declared a republic in 1970. Under the Internal Settlement in 1979, after a long period of conflict, the country became known as Zimbabwe Rhodesia, with Abel Muzorewa as its first black prime minister.

None of these acts were recognised internationally, and under the Lancaster House Agreement the country's government agreed to revert to colonial status in 1979 to facilitate the introduction of majority rule and the creation of the independent state of Zimbabwe in 1980.

The office of Prime Minister of Zimbabwe was abolished in 1987, when Robert Mugabe became executive president. However, in 2009, it was restored through political negotiations, resulting in Morgan Tsvangirai becoming the first prime minister of the country in over 21 years.

List of prime ministers of Rhodesia
Parties

See also
Governor of Southern Rhodesia
President of Rhodesia
Prime Minister of Zimbabwe Rhodesia
Prime Minister of Zimbabwe

Notes

Timeline

References

 
Rhodesia
Prime Ministers
1923 establishments in Southern Rhodesia
1979 disestablishments in Rhodesia